John J. Healy (1840–1908) was an Irish-American entrepreneur in the late 19th century, who also operated in Canada at various times. His pioneering business activities ranged from Montana to Alberta/BC, Canada and to Alaska/Yukon.

Originating from a base of operations in Montana, he and Alfred B. Hamilton established a whiskey trading post near present-day Lethbridge, Alberta in 1869. The post was originally named after Hamilton, but a second, larger post nearby was given the name of Fort Whoop-Up.

Healy sold the fort to Dave Akers in 1876.

He then took up work as the sheriff of Chouteau County in Montana, a newspaper editor and a businessman in Fort Benton, Montana.

Healy moved to the North, operating a trading post at Dyea, Alaska.  He later moved to Yukon Territory to operate a transportation company during the Klondike Gold Rush.

Healy died in 1908 as a rich and famous man.

He was buried in Seattle, Washington.

Legacy
Healy, Alaska and Healy Pass in the Alberta Rockies are named after him.

References

Bibliography
Birth of a Community: Water the Key to Development
Healy's West: The Life and Times of John J. Healy

History of Lethbridge
1908 deaths
1840 births
People of the American Old West
People of the Klondike Gold Rush
Persons of National Historic Significance (Canada)
People from Fort Benton, Montana
American expatriates in Canada